WCRW may refer to:

 1240 WCRW (Chicago) Chicago, Illinois (Facility ID #71296) — a defunct AM station that broadcast from 1926 to 1996 and was deleted in 2006
 1190 WBIS Annapolis, Maryland (Facility ID #2297) — a defunct AM station that changed its callsign to WCRW in 2011 after going silent, and was deleted shortly after to allow 1200 WAGE (AM) Leesburg VA to move to 1190
 1190 WTSD (AM) Leesburg, Virginia (Facility ID #54876) — an AM station formerly known as WAGE (AM), which changed its callsign to WCRW in April 2011 after WBIS was deleted